Betty Comden (May 3, 1917 – November 23, 2006) was an American lyricist, playwright, and screenwriter who contributed to numerous Hollywood musicals and Broadway shows of the mid-20th century. Her writing partnership with Adolph Green spanned six decades: "the longest running creative partnership in theatre history." The musical-comedy duo of Comden and Green collaborated most notably with composers Jule Styne and Leonard Bernstein, as well enjoyed success with Singin' in the Rain, as part of the famed "Freed unit" at MGM.

Early life
Betty Comden was born Basya Cohen in Brooklyn, New York in 1917, the younger child of Leo Cohen (originally Astershinsky), a lawyer, and Rebecca ( Sadvoransky) Cohen, an English teacher. Both were Russian immigrants and observant Jews. She had an older brother, Nathaniel ("Nat"), born . Basya "attended Erasmus Hall High School and studied drama at New York University, graduating in 1938," according to The New York Times.

In 1938, mutual friends introduced her to Adolph Green, an aspiring actor. Along with the young Judy Holliday and Leonard Bernstein, Comden and Green formed a troupe called the Revuers, which performed at the Village Vanguard, a club in Greenwich Village. Due to the act's success, the Revuers appeared in the 1944 film Greenwich Village, but their roles were so small they were barely noticed, and they returned to New York.

Comden and Green's first Broadway show was in 1944, with On the Town, a musical about three sailors on leave in New York City that was an expansion of a ballet entitled Fancy Free on which Bernstein had been working with choreographer Jerome Robbins. Comden and Green wrote the book and lyrics, which included sizable parts for themselves (as "Claire" and "Ozzie"). Their next musical, Billion Dollar Baby in 1945, with music by Morton Gould was not a success, and their 1947 show Bonanza Bound closed out-of-town and never reached Broadway.

Broadway and film success
Comden and Green headed to California and soon found work at MGM. They wrote the screenplays for Good News and The Barkleys of Broadway (which reunited Fred Astaire and Ginger Rogers), and then adapted On the Town for Frank Sinatra and Gene Kelly, scrapping most of Bernstein's music at the request of Arthur Freed, who did not care for the Bernstein score. The duo reunited with Gene Kelly for their most successful project, the classic Singin' in the Rain, about Hollywood in the final days of the silent film era. Comden and Green provided the story and screenplay; the songs were hits from the late 1920s and early 1930s by Arthur Freed and Nacio Herb Brown.

They followed this with another hit, The Band Wagon, in which the characters of Lester and Lily, a husband-and-wife musical-writing team, were patterned after themselves. They were Oscar-nominated twice, for their screenplays for The Band Wagon and It's Always Fair Weather.  Both films also received Screen Writers Guild Awards;  On the Town did too.

Comden and Green's stage work of the 1950s included Two on the Aisle, starring Bert Lahr and Dolores Gray, with music by Jule Styne; Wonderful Town, a musical adaptation of the play My Sister Eileen, with music by Bernstein; and Bells Are Ringing, which reunited them with Judy Holliday and Jule Styne. The score, including the standards "Just in Time", "Long Before I Knew You", and "The Party's Over", proved to be one of their richest.

The duo contributed additional lyrics to the 1954 musical Peter Pan, translated and streamlined Die Fledermaus for the Metropolitan Opera, and collaborated with Styne on songs for the play-with-music Say, Darling. In 1958, they appeared on Broadway in A Party with Betty Comden and Adolph Green, a revue that included some of their early sketches. It was a critical and commercial success, and they brought an updated version back to Broadway in 1977.

The pair wrote the screenplay for Auntie Mame in 1958. The New York Times movie review from that year lays it out as follows:

Comden and Green's Broadway work in the 1960s included four collaborations with Jule Styne. They wrote the lyrics for Do Re Mi, and the book and lyrics for Subways Are For Sleeping, Fade Out – Fade In, and Hallelujah, Baby! Their Hallelujah, Baby! score won a Tony Award.

Comden and Green wrote the libretto for the 1970 musical Applause, an adaptation of the film All About Eve, and wrote the book and lyrics for 1978's On the Twentieth Century, with music by Cy Coleman. Comden also played Letitia Primrose in that musical when original star Imogene Coca left the show. Comden and Green's final musical hit was 1991's The Will Rogers Follies, providing lyrics to Cy Coleman's music. The duo's biggest failure was 1982's A Doll's Life, an attempt to figure out what Nora did after she abandoned her husband in Henrik Ibsen's A Doll's House, which ran for only five performances, although they received Tony Award nominations for its book and score.

In 1980, Comden was inducted into the Songwriters Hall of Fame. And, in 1981, she was inducted into the American Theatre Hall of Fame. In the early 1980s, Comden acted in Wendy Wasserstein's play Isn't It Romantic, portraying the lead character's mother.

In 1984, filmmaker Sidney Lumet directed a film about Greta Garbo, Garbo Talks, starring Anne Bancroft and Ron Silver. The producers of the film were sure that the real Garbo either could not be located or would refuse flatly to appear in a cameo. They asked a known associate of Garbo to ask the great actress if she would appear in the film, but received no response. So, Comden was asked to appear in the film for the brief, pivotal "over-the-shoulder" scenes.

Comden and Green received Kennedy Center Honors in 1991.

In 1994, Comden and Green were guest callers, "Linda" and "Walter", on the long-running sit-com Frasier in the episode entitled "Burying a Grudge."

Family
Comden and Green were a creative partnership, not a romantic couple. In 1942, Comden married Siegfried Schutzman, a designer and businessman, who changed his name to Steven Kyle. He died in 1979 of acute pancreatitis. They had two children, a daughter, Susanna, and a son, Alan, who died in 1990. 
 
 She never remarried.

Death
Betty Comden died of heart failure following an undisclosed illness of several months at New York Presbyterian Hospital in Manhattan on Thanksgiving Day, November 23, 2006, aged 89. She was buried in Mount Carmel Cemetery in Glendale, New York.

Awards and nominations

References

External links

 
 
 
 Betty Comden writes about teaching
 
 Comden and Green papers, 1933–2003. Billy Rose Theatre Division, New York Public Library
 Betty Comden Papers, 1929–2004. Billy Rose Theatre Division, New York Public Library
 New York Public Library Blog on Comden and Green's Unproduced Screenplay, Wonderland

Further reading
 Off Stage, a memoir by Betty Comden published in 1995

Screenwriters from New York (state)
1917 births
2006 deaths
Grammy Award winners
Kennedy Center honorees
American musical theatre librettists
American musical theatre lyricists
American women dramatists and playwrights
American women screenwriters
Broadway composers and lyricists
Women librettists
Jewish American songwriters
Erasmus Hall High School alumni
Steinhardt School of Culture, Education, and Human Development alumni
Songwriters from New York (state)
Tony Award winners
Writers from Brooklyn
20th-century American dramatists and playwrights
21st-century American writers
20th-century American women writers
20th-century American screenwriters
21st-century American women
20th-century American Jews
21st-century American Jews